El Jícaro is a municipality in the Nueva Segovia Department of Nicaragua. 
It is a sister village to Yellow Springs, Ohio.

References

Municipalities of the Nueva Segovia Department